Tatiana Karelina (born 1980) is a Russian entrepreneur living in London, United Kingdom. She is the founder of Tatiana Karelina, a chain of self-named salons specialising in hair extensions with locations in Los Angeles, London and Manchester. She is credited for introducing the Micro Ring hair extension technique from the United States into the UK.

Early life
Karelina, was born to Soviet parents in Kashin, Russia, a rural agricultural area 250 km north-east of Moscow.   In 2000, at the age of 20, Karelina left Kashin on a student's visa for the United States, where she spent the summer learning English.   In 2002, she graduated from Tver State University with a degree in linguistics before moving to London, where she took an apprenticeship with Lucinda Ellery, a salon that specialised in hair loss and hair extensions.

Career
In 2006, Karelina left Lucinda Ellery to set up Tatiana Hair Extensions from her 1-bedroom house in Barnet.  Over the next few years, she built her reputation as one of the UK's premier hair extensionists by combining micro rings with high-quality Russian hair and her proprietary "strand-by-strand" colour blending technique.  But it was on the back of the British Broadcasting company (BBC Three) documentary Jamelia: Whose Hair Is It Anyway? that she rose to prominence and at the height of the financial crisis Karelina took a leap of faith and set up her own salon in Kensington, England.  Success quickly followed and she opened a second salon in Manchester in 2010.  In 2011, Karelina was approached by Sky UK's Moscow correspondent, Amanda Walker to accompany her to Russia to film a documentary on the hair extension industry in Russia. In 2015, Karelina rebranded from Tatiana Hair Extensions to Tatiana Karelina as a precursor for their entry into the United States.  In February 2016, Karelina made her foray into session styling at the Felder Felder London Fashion Week show where she was credited with creating one of the most talked-about hairstyles of the week, the Unicorn Braid. In October 2017, Karelina opened a salon in West Hollywood and her proximity to Hollywood enabled her to expand her celebrity clientele roster which now includes Ariana Grande, Lindsay Lohan, Stacey Solomon, and Bianca Gascoigne,

In Popular Culture
Karelina custom created Ariana Grande's signature ponytail worn during her 2019 Sweetener World Tour

Emma Thompson in the 2016 Hollywood film The Meyerowitz Stories wore a custom hairpiece created by Karelina designed to give Emma the look of a dishevelled alcoholic. The Huffington Post ranked Emma's hairstyle number 4 in their article "19 Emma Thompson Hairstyles, Ranked".

Emma Stone wore a reddish-brown Karelina ponytail in the 2019 Hollywood sequel Zombieland: Double Tap

References

External links
 The official website of Tatiana Karelina

Living people
1980 births
People from Kashinsky District
Russian expatriates in the United Kingdom